The women's discus throw at the 2022 World Athletics Championships was held at the Hayward Field in Eugene on 18 and 20 July 2022.

Records
Before the competition records were as follows:

Qualification standard
The standard to qualify automatically for entry was 63.50 m.

Schedule
The event schedule, in local time (UTC−7), was as follows:

Results

Qualification 
Qualification: Qualifying Performance 64.00 (Q) or at least 12 best performers (q) advanced to the final.

Final 
The final was started on 20 July at 18:33.

References

Discus throw
Discus throw at the World Athletics Championships